Grace Verbeke (born 12 November 1984) is a former road cyclist from Belgium. She participated at the 2007, 2008, 2009, 2010 and 2011 UCI Road World Championships.

Major results
2009
1st  Overall Tour Féminin en Limousin
1st Stage 1 
2nd Overall Tour Cycliste Féminin International Ardèche
2nd Grand Prix Elsy Jacobs
3rd Chrono Champenois - Trophée Européen

2010
1st  National Time Trial Championships
1st Tour of Flanders
1st Parkhotel Rooding Hills Classic
3rd Omloop Het Nieuwsblad

2011
1st Finale Lotto Cycling Cup - Breendonk
1st Dwars Door De Westhoek
2nd National Time Trial Championships
2nd Trofeo Costa Etrusca Iii
3rd Overall Tour Féminin en Limousin

References

External links
 

1984 births
Belgian female cyclists
Living people
Place of birth missing (living people)
People from Roeselare
Cyclists from West Flanders